Harold French Dodge (January 23, 1893 in Lowell, Massachusetts – December 10, 1976) was one of the principal architects of the science of statistical quality control. His father was the photographer  William H. Dodge. Harold Dodge is universally known for his work in originating acceptance sampling plans for putting inspection operations on a scientific basis in terms of controllable risks.  Dodge earned his B.S. in Electrical Engineering from M.I.T. in 1916 and his A.B. (Master's degree) in Physics from Columbia University in 1917.

From 1917 to 1958 worked at quality assurance department at Bell Laboratories with Walter Shewhart, George Edwards, Harry Romig, R. L. Jones, Paul Olmstead, E.G.D. Paterson, and Mary N. Torrey. At that time the basic concepts of acceptance sampling was developed, such as:
Consumer's risk
Producer's risk
Double sampling
Lot tolerance percent defective (LTPD)
Average outgoing quality limit (AOQL)

Also he originated several types of:
Acceptance sampling schemes
CSP type continuous sampling plans
Chain sampling plans
Skip-lot sampling plans

During World War II, Dodge had an office in the Pentagon and served as a consultant to the Secretary of War, to NASA and the Sandia Corporation. He was also chairman of the American Standards Association (now the American National Standards Institute) War Committee Z1, which prepared the Z1.1, Z1.2, and Zl.3 quality control standards.

After he retired from Bell Labs in 1958, Dodge became a professor of applied mathematical statistics at Rutgers. 

The American Society for Testing and Materials honors Harold Dodge's memory with the Harold F. Dodge Award.

References

http://www.asq.org/about-asq/who-we-are/bio_dodge.html

Quality experts
1893 births
1976 deaths
Fellows of the American Statistical Association
Sandia National Laboratories people